Seto leelo is the Setos' polyphonic style of folk singing.

In 2009, the Seto leelo was added to the UNESCO list of intangible cultural heritage. Seto  is usually performed by women, dressed in traditional clothing. During the Seto Kingdom Day celebration, the winning lead singer of a  group is awarded the title of "Mother of Song".

Discography
 Setusongs. Recorded in Värska und Obinitsa in May 1990. CD produced by Global Music Centre und Mipu Music (MIPUCD 104) 1991

References

Further reading 
 Lauri Honko: The Maiden's Death Song & The Great Wedding. Anne Vabarna's oral twin epic written down by A. O. Väisänen. (FF Communications, 281) Academia Scientiarum Fennica, Helsinki 2003 
 Ingrid Rüütel: Die Schichten des Volkslieds der Setukesen und ihre ethnokulturellen Hintergründe. In: Finnisch-ugrische Forschungen 49 (1988), Volume 2, pp 85–128
 Leea Virtanen: Die Liedertradition der setukesischen Frauen. In: Folklorica. Festschrift for Felix J. Oinas. Bloomington, Indiana 1988 (= Indiana University, Uralic and Altaic Series 141), pp 307–325

External links 
 Seto Leelo, Seto polyphonic singing tradition. UNESCO
 Seto Leelo, Seto polyphonic singing tradition. YouTube, UNESCO channel

Estonian music
Folk music